Michal Malý (born 29 May 1987) is a Czech football player, who currently plays for FC Tescoma Zlín as a defender. He made his Gambrinus liga debut for Zlín against Mladá Boleslav on 10 August 2008.

References

1987 births
Living people
Czech footballers
Czech First League players
FC Fastav Zlín players
Association football defenders